Ole Kirk (foaled 9 September 2017) is a multiple Group 1 winning Australian bred thoroughbred racehorse.

Background

Ole Kirk is out of the unraced mare Naturale, who is Black Caviar's full sister, making him a nephew to the champion sprinter.

He was sold at the 2019 Inglis Melbourne Premier Yearling Sale for A$675,000.

Racing career

2019/20: two-year-old season

Ole Kirk made his debut on the 15 February 2020 in the Listed Talindert Stakes at Flemington.  Starting at odds of 30/1, Ole Kirk settled behind the leaders and hit the line hard between runners to win by a short neck.

Three weeks later Ole Kirk contested the Sires' Produce Stakes again at Flemington over 1,400 metres.  On this occasion he finished in third placing with jockey Dwayne Dunn critical of how the race panned out, stating after the race, "I thought I was giving him the right run, but the runs just didn't open up today. He should have won easily."

Ole Kirk then travelled to Sydney and contested two Group 1 races at Randwick.  In the Sires' Produce Stakes he finished fourth and in the Champagne Stakes he finished third, on both occasions beaten by King's Legacy.

2020/21: three-year-old season

After a four-month break, Ole Kirk resumed racing at Rosehill in the Rosebud on the 8 August 2020 where he finished in second placing.   He finished second again at Rosehill a month later in The Run To The Rose.

On the 26 September 2020 Ole Kirk contested the A$1,000,000 Golden Rose Stakes at Rosehill.  He finished strongly to win by a head margin over stablemate North Pacific.

On the 10 October 2020 Ole Kirk started favourite in the Caulfield Guineas.  This race would prove to be his second Group 1 victory, claiming a last stride victory.  Jockey William Pike said afterwards, "Today was my first ever sit on him. I was so grateful for the support. We had to zig and zag a little bit, but I'm pretty happy we got the job done.”

After unplaced runs in the Futurity Stakes and Australian Guineas, Ole Kirk was retired from racing to commence stud duties.

Stud career

A majority share was purchased of Ole Kirk by Vinery Stud. He commenced stallion duties at their stud in the Hunter Region of New South Wales in 2021 for an initial service fee of $55,000.

Pedigree

References 

Australian racehorses
Racehorses bred in Australia
Racehorses trained in Australia
2017 racehorse births
Thoroughbred family 1-p